San Pasqual Valley High School (also known as San Pasqual High School) is a high school in Winterhaven, California, near Yuma, Arizona. It is the only high school in the San Pasqual Valley Unified School District. It is also the only out-of-state member of the Arizona Interscholastic Association.

References

External links
 AIA directory profile shows the school is in CA

Public high schools in California
High schools in Imperial County, California